Ssangmun Station is an underground station on Seoul Subway Line 4 in Dobong-gu, Seoul, South Korea.

Station layout

Vicinity
Exit 1: Changbuk Middle School, Changdong High School
Exit 2: Hanshin Imaejin APT, Taeyeong APT
Exit 3: Ssangmun Hanyang APT, Hanil Hospital
Exit 4: Sindobong Middle School

Gallery

References 

Railway stations in South Korea opened in 1985
Seoul Metropolitan Subway stations
Metro stations in Dobong District